Leningradskaya is a rural locality (a stanitsa) and the administrative center of Leningradsky District in Krasnodar Krai, Russia. 
It is requested that the name of the town be changed.
Population:

History
Founded in 1794 as Umanskoye, it was one of the first forty settlements by the Black Sea Cossacks in the Kuban region. It became a stanitsa in 1842. The stanitsa was the administrative center of the Yeysky Otdel of the Kuban Oblast.

Umanskoye survived the fall of 1932 and the winter of 1933, when hundreds of residents starved to death. In 1934, all the surviving population (1,200 families) was evicted in the northern regions of the Soviet Union and to Kazakhstan. In their stead, the stanitsa was repopulated by families from the Belarusian and Leningrad military districts and its name was changed to Leningradskaya.

References

Rural localities in Krasnodar Krai
Kuban Oblast